Victoria Philips is a solicitor in the United Kingdom. She is head of the Employment Rights Unit at Thompsons Solicitors, having qualified as a solicitor in August 1996. She was previously president of the National Union of Students between 1986-1988.

She regularly gives talks and lectures on employment law to trade union clients and speaks at events organised by the Institute of Employment Rights. She also writes articles and commentary on employment law matters for Federation News and Equal Opportunities Review.

Notable cases

Commissioners of Inland Revenue v Ainsworth] (CA) [2005] IRLR 465 (referred by House of Lords to European Court of Justice hearing 20 November 2007) – Advocate General's Opinion due 24 January 2008) [Entitlement to paid annual leave].

ASLEF v UK (ECHR) [2007] IRLR 361 [Rights of trade unions under Article 11 of the European Convention on Human Rights to exclude individuals from membership].

Posts held

 2004–present – Member and Executive Committee Member of the Industrial Law Society
 1988–1993 - National Women’s Officer, Labour Party
 1986–1988 - National President, National Union of Students
 1985–1986 - President (Welfare), National Union of Students
 1984–1985 - Member of Executive, National Union of Students
 1983–1984 - President Students’ Union, University of East Anglia

References

Year of birth missing (living people)
Living people
Presidents of the National Union of Students (United Kingdom)
Alumni of the University of East Anglia